Ahmad Bashah bin Md Hanipah is a Malaysian politician. He is a member of the United Malays National Organisation (UMNO), a component party in Barisan Nasional (BN) coalition. He was the Menteri Besar of Kedah from 4 February 2016 to 10 May 2018. He was appointed as Menteri Besar after Mukhriz Mahathir agreed to step down after losing  majority support in the state assembly. Ahmad Bashah was sworn in as Menteri Besar of Kedah the day after Mukhriz resigned, on February 4, 2016.

Following his appointment as Menteri Besar, Ahmad Bashah resigned as the Deputy Minister of Domestic Trade, Co-operatives and Consumerism and as a Senator.

In the 2018 election, Ahmad Bashah failed to retain the Suka Menanti state seat when he lost to Zamri Yusuf, of the People's Justice Party (PKR), in a three-corner fight with Mohd Sabri Omar of Pan-Malaysian Islamic Party (PAS).

Controversy
On 16 August 2016, Alor Setar MP Gooi Hsiao Leung has blasted Ahmad Bashah for accusing foreign countries of intervening in Malaysia's administration to topple its leader. Gooi asked if Ahmad Bashah was referring to the United States Department of Justice (DOJ) lawsuits to seize some US$1 billion worth of assets in the US bought with "stolen money" from 1Malaysia Development Berhad (1MDB).

Ahmad Bashah had said that he did not want any “foreign element” to determine the country's future leaders and to take over what the government had developed.

Election results

Honours

Honours of Malaysia
  :
  Knight Grand Companion of the Order of Loyalty to the Royal House of Kedah (SSDK) - Dato' Seri (2014)
  Grand Commander of the Order of Loyalty to Sultan Abdul Halim Mu'adzam Shah (SHMS) - Dato' Seri Diraja (2017)

References 

1950 births
21st-century Malaysian politicians
Living people
People from Kedah
Malaysian people of Malay descent
Malaysian Muslims
United Malays National Organisation politicians
Chief Ministers of Kedah
Members of the Kedah State Legislative Assembly
Members of the Dewan Negara
Officers of the Order of the Defender of the Realm
Medallists of the Order of the Defender of the Realm
Kedah state executive councillors